Carignano may refer to:

Places 
 Carignano, Piedmont, a municipality in the Metropolitan City of Turin, Italy
 Palazzo Carignano, a historical building in the centre of Turin, Italy
 Teatro Carignano, a theatre in Turin, Italy

People 
 House of Savoy-Carignano, a branch of the House of Savoy
 Princess of Carignano, wife of a Prince of Carignano of the House of Savoy
 César Carignano, Argentine retired footballer
 Giovanni da Carignano, priest and a pioneering cartographer from Genoa
 Silvia Carignano, Italian former ice hockey player

Other uses 
 Carignano (grape), the wine grape

See also 

 
 Carignan (disambiguation)
 Principe di Carignano (disambiguation)